Puerto Deseado, originally called Port Desire, is a city of about 15,000 inhabitants and a fishing port in Patagonia in Santa Cruz Province of Argentina, on the estuary of the Deseado River.

It was named Port Desire by the privateer Thomas Cavendish in 1586 after the name of his ship, and later became known by the Spanish translation of the name. Today, the straggly town has a couple of pleasant squares, a former railway station and two museums, one with a collection of indigenous artifacts and one at the seafront with relics from the sloop of war HMS Swift which sank in 1770, recovered after its wreck was discovered in the port in 1982. The coast boasts spectacular scenery and colonies of marine wildlife close to the town.

History

Other Spanish expeditions followed, including Pedro Sarmiento de Gamboa. He named the harbour Port Desire after his ship, and the point of land at the harbour mouth is still known as Punta Cavendish. They met only a few Native Americans, who shot arrows that wounded some of the crew. After ten days Cavendish took his ships on their way, and returned to England in 1588. In 1591 Cavendish set out on another expedition with five ships, himself sailing as admiral on the Leicester Galleon, while the Desire was commanded by captain John Davis. They suffered problems in the winter at the Strait of Magellan so turned north, and on 20 May 1592 the Desire and the Black Pinnace lost touch with other ships and went into Port Desire to wait for Cavendish. He did not turn up, so in August they sailed to the nearby Penguin Island then south, but were caught by a storm and, forced to run before the wind, came on unknown islands, making the first probable sighting of the Falkland Islands .

In 1670 John Narborough visited Port Desire and claimed the territory for England, but no substantial attempt was made to assert the British claim against the Spanish claim to the region. Captain John Byron went on from there to claim British possession of the Falklands in the 1760s, and when the Spanish attacked there in 1770 one of the ships forced to flee was the sloop-of-war Swift which returned to Port Desire, but was shipwrecked on a concealed rock.

Antonio de Biedma founded the Nueva Colonia de Floridablanca in 1780 in the area near present-day Puerto Deseado, later shut down by Viceroy Vertíz.

In 1790 a fort was established at Puerto Deseado by the Real Compañía Marítima (Royal Maritime Company) of Charles IV of Spain, which served as a base for whaling until its abandonment in 1806.

On 23 December 1833, the young naturalist, Charles Darwin, aboard HMS Beagle, commanded by captain Robert FitzRoy stopped at the port.

Traffic
The town was serviced by the freight railwayline running form Las Heras via Pico Truncado to Puerto Deseado up until 1976. According to Railway gazette, this line will be modernized shortly for reopening end of 2015 or the beginning of 2016.
The town is connected to the national road system via a 120 km long nearly straight secondary road.

Climate
Under the Köppen climate classification, Puerto Deseado has a cold semi-arid climate (BSk) with mild, occasionally warm summers and cold winters. In spite of the lack of rainfall, the weather generally remains cloudy, with average temperatures and gloominess being reminiscent of the British Isles. Due to the effect of more continental interior conditions, occasional extreme heat and harsh frosts do appear.

Tourism
Most of the tourism industry is based on touring the estuary to see the diverse fauna, such as the Commerson's dolphin, Magellanic and Rockhopper penguins.

Economy
Puerto Deseado's economy is based on the fishing industry. There are several fish-processing plants by its coasts on "Avenida Costanera" and a high percentage of the population works on jobs related to industrial fishing such as stevedores, crane operators, fish cleaners and the like.

References in films and literature

Films 
The movie "Gone Fishing" by Carlos Sorín is set almost entirely in Puerto Deseado.

Literature 
Puerto Deseado is the main setting of the novels The Sunken Secret and The Arrow Collector by Cristian Perfumo. The Sunken Secret is based on the true story of the wreck and recovery of HMS Swift (1763) a British sloop of war that sank off the town's coast. 

The town is mentioned in The Whispering Land by the naturalist and author, Gerald Durrell.

See also

ARA Puerto Deseado (Q-20) oceanographic ship

References

Notes

External links

 Official website
 
Map of Puerto Deseado

Port settlements in Argentina
Populated coastal places in Argentina
Populated places in Santa Cruz Province, Argentina
Populated places established in 1884
1884 establishments in Argentina
Cities in Argentina
Argentina
Santa Cruz Province, Argentina